The House That Hate Built is a compilation album by Hate Dept., released on August 7, 2001 by Mars Colony Music. The first disc contains demos and live tracks.

Reception
DJ Arcanus of Lollipop Magazine gave The House That Hate Built a mixed review, saying "show[s] the band dabbling across many genres and never achieving more than mediocrity."

Track listing

Personnel
Adapted from the liner notes of The House That Hate Built.

 The Gerrixx – cover art, photography
 Dustin Moore – photography
 Steven Seibold – production

Release history

References

External links 
 
 The House That Hate Built at Discogs (list of releases)

1998 albums
Hate Dept. albums